Jurubatuba is train station on ViaMobilidade Line 9-Emerald, located in the district of Jurubatuba in São Paulo.

History
Jurubatuba station was opened by Sorocaba Railway (EFS) on 25 January 1957, along with Jurubatuba Branch.

In the 1970s, Fepasa incorporated EFS and started reforms in the metropolitan train system, which included Jurubatuba station, reopened on 14 March 1987. CPTM, created in 1992, incorporated the metropolitan train lines from FEPASA in 1996. In the 2000s, the station was remodernized and remodeled, and was reopened on 17 October 2007.

References

Railway stations opened in 1957
Railway stations opened in 1987
Railway stations opened in 2007